Larisa B.C. (Greek: Λάρισα K.A.E.), or Larisa Basket (alternate spelling: Larissa), is a Greek professional basketball club that is located in Larissa, Greece. It is a part of the G.S. Ermis Agias Larisa (Γ.Σ. Ερμής Αγιάς Λάρισα) multi-sports club. The club's full original name was Gymnastikos Syllogos Agias Ermis Larisa (Γυμναστικός Σύλλογος Επαρχίας Αγιάς Ερμής Λάρισα). The club's official emblem is a seal with Hermes (Ermis) on it, one of the Greek gods. The team's colors are white and blue. 

The team most recently competed in the Greek Basket League, the top-tier level of Greek basketball. Their highest position in the league's final standings has been the 4th, achieved during the 2021-2022 campaign, under coach Fotis Takianos. The club's professional future has been in disarray since the departure of owner and president Theodoros Rizoulis in the summer of 2022.

History
Larisa B.C. was originally founded as Ermis Agias Larisa B.C. (Ερμής Αγιάς Λάρισα K.A.E.), in 1984. With the club originally being located in Agia, Larissa (regional unit), Greece. The club won the Greek 4th Division's 3rd Group, during the 2015–16 season, and was thus promoted up to the Greek 3rd Division, for the 2016–17 season. The team was then promoted up to the Greek 2nd Division, for the 2017–18 season.

Ermis Agias Larisa was given a wild card place in the top-tier level Greek Basket League's 2019–20 season. The club then relocated from Agia to Larissa (city), and was renamed to Larisa Basketball Club.

Arenas
Larisa B.C.'s main home arena is the Larissa Neapolis Indoor Arena, which is located in the city of Larissa. The arena has a seating capacity of 4,000 people in the permanent upper tier, and it can be expanded to a capacity of 5,500 people with optional retractable seating added to the lower tier. The club previously played its home games at the small 300 seat Agias Municipal Indoor Sports Center, which is located in Agia.

Honors and titles

Domestic competitions
Greek 4th Division 3rd Group Champion: (2015–16)

Season by season

Roster

Notable players

 Nestoras Kommatos 
 Dimitris Cheilaris
 Ioannis Demertzis
 Nikos Kalles 
 Zois Karampelas 
 Dimitrios Lolas 
 Paris Maragkos 
 Spyros Mourtos 
 Kostas Papadakis
 Vassilis Papadopoulos
 Nondas Papantoniou 
 Tasos Spyropoulos
 Michalis Tsairelis 
 Vangelis Tzolos 
 Ioannis Vavatsikos 
 Theodoros Zaras 
 Jānis Bērziņš 
 Rihards Kuksiks 
 Dovydas Redikas
 Marin Marić 
 Stefan Živanović
 Johnny Berhanemeskel
/ Ousman Krubally
 Ken Brown
 Davion Berry
 Jehyve Floyd
 Billy Garrett Jr.
 Wesley Gordon
 Devonte Green
 Darnell Harris
 Anthony Hickey
 Jalen Hudson
 Stefan Moody
 Terell Parks
 Scottie Reynolds
 Brandon Rush
 Jerry Smith
 Elijah Thomas
 DeVaughn Washington
 James Webb III

Head coaches

References

External links
 Official Website 
 Larisa B.C. Facebook 
 Eurobasket.com Team Profile

 
1984 establishments in Greece
Basketball teams established in 1984
Basketball teams in Greece
Sports clubs in Thessaly